Wen Yanbo (23 October 1006 – 16 June 1097), courtesy name Kuanfu, was a scholar-official of the Song dynasty who served four emperors over more than five decades. He was a grand councilor during Emperor Renzong's reign.

During Emperor Renzong's reign
After passing the imperial examination in 1027, Wen Yanbo first became the magistrate of Yicheng County. Later he was appointed controller-general (通判) of Jiang Prefecture. Eventually he arrived in the capital Kaifeng to serve under Emperor Renzong, first as an investigating censor (監察御史) and later as a palace censor (殿中侍御史).

In 1038, Tangut people in Song's northwestern region declared their independence, naming their state Xia (known in history as Western Xia) and invaded Song. Wen Yanbo suggested to Emperor Renzong that marshals in the front line should be given independent authorities to discipline subordinate generals for desertion and cowardice. The rule had been that marshals needed permission from the imperial court first, in order to carry out such orders. Wen argued that this rule may only be implemented during peaceful times, because during times of war, enforcement of military law and concentration of military power is of utmost importance to military commanders. Emperor Renzong took his advice and praised him.

In 1040, Western Xia army attacked Yan Prefecture. General Liu Ping (劉平) went to reinforce the city, but was ambushed and trapped in a hill. Liu sent urgent messages asking another general Huang Dehe (黃德和) to reinforce him, but Huang was afraid and deserted in the opposite direction. As a result Liu was captured, and Huang told the emperor that Liu defected, even bribing Liu's servant to corroborate his claims. Emperor Renzong sent Wen Yanbo to Hezhong to judge the case. After careful examinations, Wen discovered the truth, but Huang, who had many "connections" in the capital, attempted to discredit Wen's findings. As a result, Emperor Renzong sent another official, Pang Ji, to re-investigate the case. Wen told Pang that he should go back as the case was already closed. Eventually Pang accepted Wen's findings and executed both Huang and Liu's servant.

References

1006 births
1097 deaths
Ancient Chinese censors
Song dynasty chancellors
Song dynasty politicians from Shanxi
Politicians from Jinzhong